Michelle Seymour (born 21 December 1965) is a former New Zealand representative sprinter.

1993 - 2021 New Zealand National record for the Women's 100m.

1993 NZ Māori Sportswoman of the Year.

2018 Inducted into the Paraparaumu College Hall of Fame.

Personal Bests

NZ National Titles

NZ Secondary School Titles

Representation

References

External links

Video https://www.youtube.com/watch?v=2cALiNlHhqQ

Living people
1965 births
New Zealand female sprinters
Athletes (track and field) at the 1990 Commonwealth Games
Athletes (track and field) at the 1994 Commonwealth Games
Commonwealth Games competitors for New Zealand